Bassi Kalan is a village in Hoshiarpur, Punjab, India. Its population is about 10,000 people, Mainly Hindus and (Saini & Harijans). Bassi Kalan is a village in Hoshiarpur-ii Tehsil in Hoshiarpur District of Punjab State, India. It is located 14 km towards South from District headquarters Hoshiarpur. 4 km from Hoshiarpur-Ii. 127 km from State capital Chandigarh.

Saido Patti (1 km), Mehina (1 km), Parsowal (2 km), Chabewal (2 km), Rajni Devi (2 km) are the nearby Villages to Bassi Kalan. Bassi Kalan to (2 km) far is a big ancient Temple of Mahadev Temple.

Bassi Kalan is surrounded by Mahilpur Tehsil towards South, Hoshiarpur-I Tehsil towards west, Haroli Tehsil towards East, Garhshankar Tehsil towards South.
Hoshiarpur, Phagwara, Nangal, Nawanshahr are the nearby Cities to Bassi Kalan. There is a dispensary clinic. The Delhi-Chandigarh road also passes through it. There is also a telephone exchange and post office. There is a temple of Mata Dineshwari inside the village where Jagran is held every year on 28 May. There is another ancient temple which is known as Bodi. Bassi Kalan Pin code is 146102.

This Place is in the border of the Hoshiarpur District and Una District. Una District Gagret is North towards this place . It is near to the Himachal Pradesh State Border.

Schools 

•	Government Senior Secondary School

•	Primary School.

•	Lala Lajpat Rai Siksha Kender School.

 From: Childhood Group Bassi kalan

Cities and towns in Hoshiarpur district